Millstone Township may refer to:

 Millstone Township, New Jersey
 Millstone Township, Elk County, Pennsylvania

Township name disambiguation pages